The Thorpe rail accident occurred on 10 September 1874, when two trains were involved in a head-on collision at Thorpe St Andrew in the English county of Norfolk.

The two trains involved were the 20:40 mail from Yarmouth and the 17:00 express from London to Yarmouth. The latter had left Norwich Thorpe at 21:30 and would normally have had a clear run on its way to Yarmouth, since the mail train should have been held on a loop line at Brundall to allow the express to pass. On this occasion trains were running late.

In such circumstances, when the timetable was upset, drivers had to have written authority to proceed further. Due to a series of errors (primarily, the telegraph clerk sending the authorization message before it had been signed by the appropriate official), both drivers received their authority, and anxious to make up for lost time, set off at speed along the single track. The accident, when it occurred around 21:45, resulted in both locomotives rearing into the air, and carriages reduced to wreckage.

Both drivers and firemen were killed, as were 17 passengers with four later dying from their injuries. 73 passengers and two railway guards were seriously injured.

Prompted by the accident, engineer Edward Tyer developed the tablet system in which a token is given to the train driver; this must be slotted into an electric interlocking device at the other end of the single-track section before another train is allowed to pass.

Similar accidents 
The Canoe River train crash in Canada in 1950 also involved two trains, controlled by telegraphed orders, authorized to enter the same single-track section in opposite directions.

References

External links 
Illustrated London News report
History feature on the disaster by BBC Radio Norfolk
Broadland Memories

Railway accidents and incidents in Norfolk
History of Norfolk
Railway accidents in 1874
1874 in England
Train collisions in England
Norwich
Transport in Norwich
19th century in Norfolk
1874 disasters in the United Kingdom